The Department of Environment Index (DoE) is an index of urban poverty published by the Department for Environment, Food and Rural Affairs and designed to assess relative levels of deprivation in local authorities in  [England]. (Elliot, 1997)

The DoE has three dimensions of deprivation: social, economic and housing.

References
 Elliott P, Cuzick J, English D, Stern R. Geographical and Environmental Epidemiology: Methods for Small-Area Studies. Oxford University Press. New York, 1997

Environment of England